Hagerman Lake is a  lake in Iron County, Michigan. The lake is largely developed with houses surrounded by dense forest. The Hagerman Lake Recreation Area lies on the southern point of the lake. It has public access and a boat launch. Hagerman Lake falls within the Ottawa National Forest.

See also 
 List of lakes in Michigan

References

Lakes of Michigan